"Rules and Regulations" is a song written and performed by Canadian-American singer-songwriter Rufus Wainwright. It was the second single from Wainwright's fifth studio album, Release the Stars, released digitally via iTunes in the UK on July 30, 2007.

Despite the success of Release the Stars, which reached No. 2 on the UK Albums Chart, and the performance of "Going to a Town", the first single from the album that reached #54 on the UK Singles Chart, "Rules and Regulations" failed to chart in any nation. A music video, directed by Petro Papahadjopoulos, was also created to promote the single.

Track listing

UK digital single
"Rules and Regulations"

Personnel
 Rufus Wainwright – vocals, acoustic guitar, horn arrangement
 Carl Albach – trumpet, piccolo trumpet 
 Steven Bernstein – trumpet, conducting
 Jason Boshoff – programming
 John Chudoba – trumpet
 Marius de Vries – programming
 Dominic Derasse – trumpet, piccolo trumpet
 Rachelle Garniez – claviola, accordion
 Jeff Hill – electric bass, upright bass
 Matt Johnson – drums, recorder
 Gerry Leonard – guitar 
 Dan Levine – trombone
 Larry Mullins – shaker, tambourine, tabla, woodblock, fish
 Jack Petruzelli – acoustic guitar
 Neil Tennant – backing vocals, synthesizer
 Dave Trigg – trumpet, piccolo trumpet

Music video
Petro Papahadjopoulos directed the music video for "Rules and Regulations", which features a group of men performing a choreographed dance around a long john-wearing Wainwright inside a London mansion.

References

2007 singles
2007 songs
Geffen Records singles
Rufus Wainwright songs
Song recordings produced by Rufus Wainwright
Songs written by Rufus Wainwright